Asociación Deportivo Pasto, also known as Deportivo Pasto, is a Colombian professional football team based in the city of Pasto, that currently plays in the Categoría Primera A. They play their home games at the Estadio Departamental Libertad. Deportivo Pasto is both the southernmost and westernmost based team in the Colombian league.

Founded in 1949, Pasto has won the league title once in the 2006 Apertura and finished as runner-up three times: in the 2002 Finalizacion, 2012 Apertura, and 2019 Apertura. The club has also finished runners-up twice in the Copa Colombia: in 2009 and 2012.

History 
The club was founded on 12 October 1949, and was a semi-pro team until 1996. That year, they were promoted to the professional second division, the Primera B, and achieved promotion into the Primera A in 1998. In their first top-flight season, the 1999 Apertura, Pasto finished twelfth in the league table. In the 1999 Finalización, Pasto finished in the top eight and qualified for the playoffs, where they finished last in the group with just one point. 

In the 2006 Apertura, Pasto finished eighth in the table, the last seed to qualify for the playoffs. In the playoffs Pasto won their group and qualified for the finals, where they beat Deportivo Cali in the finals and won their first ever league title. In the 2006 Finalización, Pasto finished seventh and qualified for the playoffs again, but failed to make the finals. As league champions, Pasto earned a spot in the 2007 Copa Libertadores, their debut in the competition. Their first match was a 1–0 loss to Santos at home. However, the rest of the campaign was a complete failure, and the club had one of the worst campaigns in Libertadores history, being one of the only teams to lose all six group games, with only three goals in their favor. 

In the 2009 Copa Colombia, the team reached the finals for the first time, where it lost to Independiente Santa Fe on penalties. Pasto was relegated to the Primera B that year as well, after finishing last in the relegation table (aggregate of last 3 seasons).

For the 2010 season, now in the Primera B, the club placed second in the table, advancing to the playoffs. In the playoffs, Pasto won its group and advanced to the playoff finals. In the finals, the club lost to Itagüí Ditaires, and missed out on direct promotion. However, the club still had a chance to be promoted with the relegation/promotion playoff, which would be played against the second-to-last club in the Primera A league table, Envigado. Envigado won 3–0 on aggregate, which meant Pasto would spend another season in the second division. 

For the 2011 Apertura, coach Jorge Luis Bernal was replaced by Flabio Torres. The club began the season with a first-place league finish, with high expectations to win the title. In the playoffs, the club lost in the quarterfinals to Valledupar on penalties. For the 2011 Finalización, the team finished first in the league again. In the playoffs, it eliminated Uniautónoma with a 4–0 win and Expreso Rojo with a 5–1 win, making it to the finals against Centauros Villavicencio and winning to become the champion. To decide who would be directly promoted to the top flight, Pasto had to play Patriotas Boyacá, the Apertura champion. Pasto won the match on penalties, and earned direct promotion, while Patriotas had to play a promotion playoff. Pasto had one of the best Primera B campaigns ever, finishing with 91 points on the aggregate table, 24 points clear of the second placed team, Deportivo Rionegro. 

The club had an excellent return to the Primera A, which was the 2012 season. In the Apertura, the club finished 6th and qualified to the playoffs, where it won its group, and qualified for the finals in an attempt to win their second league title, but lost to Santa Fe. For the 2012 Finalización, Pasto finished eighth in the league table, being the last team to advance to the playoffs. In the playoffs, the club narrowly missed out on the final, finishing second in the group to eventual champions Millonarios on goal difference. In 2012, Pasto also made the finals of the Copa Colombia, losing 2–0 to Atlético Nacional on aggregate. 

In the 2019 Apertura, Pasto made the championship finals once again, but lost to Atlético Junior 5–4 on penalties.

Honours

Categoría Primera A:
Winners (1): 2006–I
Runners-up (3): 2002–II, 2012–I, 2019–I

Categoría Primera B:
Winners (2): 1998, 2011
Runners-up (1): 2010

Copa Colombia:
Runners-up (2): 2009, 2012

Performance in CONMEBOL competitions

Notes
 FS: First stage
 GS: Group stage
 PR: Preliminary round
 R16: Round of 16
 SS: Second stage

Stadium

Name – Estadio Libertad
City – Pasto
Capacity – 25,000
Inauguration – 1954
Pitch size – 120 x 90 m

Players

Current squad

Out on loan

Managers

 Carlos Valencia (1996–97)
 Félix Valverde (1998–99)
 Jairo Enríquez (2000)
 Carlos Restrepo (2000)
 Félix Valverde (2000)
 Jairo Enríquez (2001)
 Hugo Castaño (2002)
 Néstor Otero (Jan 1, 2002–Dec 31, 2003)
 Miguel Augusto Prince (2003–04)
 Carlos Navarrete (2004)
 Jairo Enríquez (2004)
 Néstor Otero (Jan 1, 2005–Dec 31, 2005)
 Oscar Héctor Quintabani (2006)
 Santiago Escobar (July 1, 2006–Dec 31, 2006)
 Álvaro de Jesús Gómez (2007)
 Carlos Rendón (2007)
 Miguel Augusto Prince (2007–08)
 Jorge Bermúdez (2008)
 Bernardo Redín (2008–09)
 Jorge Luis Bernal (March 25, 2009–Dec 31, 2009)
 Hernán Darío Herrera (2010)
 Jorge Luis Bernal (2010)
 Flabio Torres (Jan 10, 2011–Dec 7, 2013)
 Jorge Luis Bernal (Dec 7, 2013–May 28, 2014)
 Wilson Gutierrez (May 29, 2014–14)
 Oscar Héctor Quintabani (2015)
 Giovanny Ruiz (2015)
 Guillermo "El Teacher" Berrío (2015 - 2016)
 José Fernando Santa (2016)
 Flabio Torres (2017 - 2018)
 Alexis García (2019 -)

References

External links

 Official Website
 Deportivo Pasto on DIMAYOR.com

Pasto, Colombia
Football clubs in Colombia
Association football clubs established in 1949
1949 establishments in Colombia
Categoría Primera A clubs
Categoría Primera B clubs